OKP may refer to:

Okayplayer
Osteo-keratoprosthesis, see Osteo-odonto-keratoprosthesis
Obligatorische Krankenpflegeversicherung, see Healthcare in Liechtenstein
Obywatelski Klub Parlamentarny, see Solidarity Citizens' Committee